Hinsdale Central High School, or HCHS (locally referred to as simply "Central") is a public four-year high school located at the corner of W. 55th St. and S. Grant St. in Hinsdale, Illinois, a western suburb of Chicago, Illinois, in the United States.  Founded in 1879, the school is well known for its large spending per student, academic excellence, and athletic programs.  It is part of Hinsdale Township High School District No. 86, which also includes Hinsdale South High School. The school is 17 miles west of Chicago and serves a suburban residential area of approximately 35,000 people. The Central campus draws its students from all of the village of Hinsdale, majority of Clarendon Hills and Oak Brook, and small parts of Burr Ridge, Darien, Willowbrook and Westmont.

The official name of the school is Hinsdale Township High School Central, often abbreviated Hinsdale TWP HS Central. This name is derived from the school's original name: Hinsdale Township High School (HTHS). "Central" was added to the original name when Hinsdale South High School opened in 1965.

History

The high school began as a single classroom added in 1879 to the elementary school, then known as South Side School. The classroom was added when community members saw the need for education beyond eighth grade.  All twelve grades shared the ca. 1866 schoolhouse, built at Garfield and Third Streets by William Robbins. At this time, there were five teachers, including the principal, teaching about 120 students grades 1 through 12. The first high school class graduated in 1883 and had four students: Alice Warren, Minnie Hinds, Grace Redfield, and Florence Webster.

In 1894 the school building burned, and was replaced by a new building on the same site.  In 1911 the school district was reorganized, and the school became officially known as Hinsdale Township High School.  In 1916 a new school building was completed nearby.

By the 1930s, a site for a new school to serve the growing community was purchased south of town at the corner of 55th & Grant Streets.  Though a new football field was dedicated on this property in 1932, Depression and World War II constraints postponed construction until 1948.  The current high school building was dedicated in 1950.

By the 1960s, two additional school sites were purchased.  Hinsdale South High School opened in 1965 at the corner of Clarendon Hills Road and 75th Street in Darien.  It was then that the word "Central" was added to the name of the school.  The other property at the corner of Midwest Road and 31st Street in Oak Brook, for a potential Hinsdale North High School, was later determined to be not needed, and was sold.  This property now forms part of the Trinity Lakes Subdivision.

In 2004, the school underwent additional construction to alleviate crowded hallways and rebuild deteriorating parts of the building. The reconstruction included a new 5 million dollar library, extended cafeteria, and connected hallways greatly opening up the campus and improving the flow of traffic.

In 2007, it was the only high school in the country to be nominated as a Character Counts school and was named Character Counts School of the Year 

In 2009, Hinsdale Central was named the National School Of Character by the Character Counts! organization.

In 2015, Hinsdale Central set a record, winning eight state athletic championships in a single season. The state championship teams included girls tennis, girls golf, boys wrestling, boys cross country, boys soccer, boys golf, boys swimming, and boys tennis .

In April 2019, a $140 million referendum was passed that would renovate the buildings of Hinsdale Central High School and Hinsdale South High School. Many Hinsdale Central Students were in favor of the referendum, citing outdated infrastructure and mold, and supported the Vote Yes campaign. Another notable effort by students to support the referendum occurred when then-juniors David Chu and Herbert Wang, along with then-freshman Grant Zhang hosted a cooking competition to raise money for the Vote Yes campaign. The referendum would be passed in April with nearly 60% of voters voting in favor of the referendum.

In the years of 2021 and 2022, various construction projects within the referendum would be completed. In the summer of 2021, the Don Watson Aquatic Center replaced the old pool as the primary aquatics facility. The $20.5 million pool was mainly funded by the aforementioned 2019 referendum. The former pool was filled in and temporarily used as a multipurpose room. In addition, many classrooms received renovation and were fitted with new desks and chairs, whiteboards, carpets, and walls. In the spring of 2022, the Student Commons were constructed and replaced an old wing of the school that contained a few conference rooms. Within the Commons are a set of large steps that the administration referred to as the "Learning Stairs". The Activities Office and Counseling Department were also moved to section near the Student Commons. In the summer of 2022, more construction was completed. A new entrance on Grant Street known as the Grant Street Plaza replaced the old entrance to the old pool. A new band practice room was constructed. The multipurpose room from the 2021-2022 school year was converted to a gymnastics gym. The Student Cafeteria was also completely redone, with new floors and tables, as well as creating a new system of lunch lines. The basement of the school, where Career and Technical Education was taught, also received renovation, giving it wider spaces for woodworking, metalworking, and robotics classes.

Academics
In 2021, Hinsdale Central High School was rated the 52nd best public high school in the U.S. and ranked #7 in Illinois-based high schools by Newsweek Magazine's annual “America’s Best High Schools” feature.  

The Class of 2017 average SAT score was 1218, 8th in the state of Illinois. Hinsdale Central students are well-prepared for success, and flourishing in a challenging environment with a 13:1 student-to-teacher ratio.

Student life

Athletics 

The school competes within the Illinois High School Association (IHSA), and has won at least 106 state championships to date. Current sports include boys' and girls' lacrosse, basketball, bowling, cross country, golf, gymnastics, soccer, swimming, tennis, track and field, volleyball, and water polo.

In addition, the school has boys; baseball, football, and wrestling teams and girls' badminton and softball teams.

Furthermore, while not sponsored by the IHSA, the school also sponsors girls' lacrosse, and a boys' hockey team (known as the "Ice Devils").

At the State level, Hinsdale Central holds more top four finishes in all combined sports than any high school in Illinois, with the sole exception of New Trier High School.

Hinsdale Central has finished in the top four in several IHSA sponsored state championship series. Among them: [ Hinsdale Central Athletic Records at IHSA.org ]

Badminton (girls) - State Champions (2007-2008; 2nd (2003-2004); 3rd (2000-2001)

Basketball (boys) - State Champions (1908-1909); 3rd (1909-1910); 4th (1907-1908)

Basketball (girls) - State Champions (2001-2002)
Cross country (boys) - State Champions (2013)

Cross country (girls) - State Champions (2006-2007); 4th (2005-2006)

Golf (boys) - State Champions (1945-1946, 1953-1954, 1960-1961, 2012-2018); 2nd (1961-1962); 3rd (1952-1953, 1962-1963, 1963-1964, 1972-1973, 1978-1979)

Golf (girls) - State Champions (2015) 2nd (2006-2007); 4th (1987-1988, 2003-2004)

Gymnastics (boys) - State Champions (1969-1970, 1970-1971, 1971-1972, 1972-1973, 1974-1975, 1975-1976, 1990-1991, 1993-1994, 1994-1995); 2nd (1968-1969, 1973-1974, 1991-1992, 1998-1999, 2005-2006); 3rd (1987-1988, 1989-1990, 1995-1996, 1996-1997, 1999-2000); 4th (1978-1979, 1992-1993, 2003-2004)

Gymnastics (girls) - 2nd (1995-1996); 4th (1977-1978)

Lacrosse (girls) - State Champions (2006-2007)

Soccer (boys) - State Champions (1975-1976); 4th (2007-2008)

Soccer (girls) - 2nd (2013) 3rd (1988-1989)

Swimming & Diving (boys) - State Champions (1962-1963, 1966-1967, 1967-1968, 1968-1969, 1969-1970, 1970-1971, 1971-1972, 1972-1973, 1973-1974, 1974-1975, 1975-1976, 1976-1977, 1977-1978, 1980-1981, 1986-1987, 1987-1988, 1988-1989); 2nd (1963-1964, 1965-1966, 1978-1979, 1979-1980, 1990-1991, 1993-1994, 1994-1995, 1995-1996); 3rd (1961-1962, 1964-1965, 1983-1984, 1984-1985, 1985-1986, 2001-2002, 2002-2003, 2003-2004); 4th (1960-1961, 1991-1992)-National Champions (1970)

Swimming & Diving (girls) - State Champions (1976-1977, 1979-1980, 1980-1981, 1990-1991, 1991-1992, 1992-1993, 1993-1994); 2nd (1978-1979, 1981-1982, 1982-1983, 1989-1990); 3rd (1977-1978, 1985-1986); 4th (1999-2000)

Tennis (boys) - State Champions (1955-1956, 1956-1957, 1957-1958, 1958-1959, 1965-1966, 1967-1968, 1971-1972, 1972-1973, 1973-1974, 1974-1975, 1975-1976, 1976-1977, 1977-1978, 1978-1979, 1979-1980, 1989-1990, 1990-1991, 2006-2007, 2007-2008); 2nd (1966-1967, 1968-1969, 1970-1971, 1982-1983, 1992-1993, 1993-1994, 1994-1995, 1996-1997, 2000-2001, 2001-2002); 3rd (1984-1985, 1988-1989, 1998-1999, 2004-2005); 4th (1981-1982, 1987-1988, 1991-1992, 1995-1996, 1997-1998, 1999-2000)

Tennis (girls) - State Champions (1976-1977, 1977-1978, 1978-1979, 1979-1980, 1983-1984, 1999-2000, 2000-01, 2003-2004, 2006-2007, 2007-2008); 2nd (1974-1975, 1980-1981, 1981-1982, 1985-1986, 1994-1995, 1997-1998, 1998-1999); 3rd (1973-1974, 1982-1983, 1986-1987, 1987-1988, 1993-1994, 2002-2003); 4th (1975-1976, 1984-1985, 2004-2005, 2005-06)

Track & Field (boys) - State Champions (1924-1925); 2nd (1919-1920); 3rd (1922-1923, 1942-1943, 1948-1949)

Track & Field (girls) - 4th (1996-1997)

Volleyball (girls) - 3rd (1977-1978)

Clubs and activities 

The school offers eighty clubs, including community service organizations, academic competition teams, foreign language groups, and special interest clubs. Many clubs have won local and state awards and competitions.

The following IHSA sponsored competitive activities have finished in the top 4 of their respective state tournament:

 Chess: 3rd place (2009–10, 2010–11, 2013–14)
 Speech Individual Events: 3rd place (2007–08, 2013–14, 2019-20); State Champions (2014–15, 2018-19)
 Scholastic Bowl:  4th place (2021-2022); 2nd place (1997–98, 2001–02, 2014–15);  State Champions (1991–92, 2015–16)
After their April 2022 4th place win in the State finals, the Illinois High School Association awarded one member of the Scholastic Bowl team with a trip to Africa. John Hines-Shah represented the team and visited Tanzania.
The Junior Varsity Scholastic Bowl team is coached by Eric Gunnar Jensen, and the Varsity team is coached by Alan McCloud.

In November 2013, the school newsmagazine, Devils' Advocate, was awarded the National Scholastic Press Association Newspaper Pacemaker Award for the 2012-2013 school year's publication.

Technology initiative
Grade notification, attendance, discipline records, schedules, and registration information are available online. Hinsdale Central has integrated their server with Microsoft's SharePoint Services solution as opposed to their original use of Blackboard in the 2003-2004 school year. Students and faculty members are also given a school email, running Microsoft Exchange Servers.

The school provides teachers with Tablet PCs, and the school is equipped with wireless internet access points. Tablet PC carts and desktop PC  workstations are also available to students. Starting in the 2018-19 school year, all students at HCHS were given Chromebooks to use for taking notes and accessing the internet. The school offers several wifi networks, each with varying degrees of access control and freedom. However, student access to the Wi-Fi was removed beginning in the 2018-19 school year, and devices have to be manually added to the new system by the school technology team. 

Hinsdale Central has a fully equipped and operating radio room which powers its own radio station, WHSD 88.5 FM. This station is also operated by Hinsdale Central's sister school, Hinsdale South High School.

Notable alumni

 Tomi Adeyemi (2011), author.
 Peter S. Bridges (1953), diplomat and writer
 Danielle Campbell (2013), actress.
 Courtney Dolehide (2009), former professional tennis player.
 Ky Dickens, filmmaker
 Kirk Dillard (1973), Illinois State Senator (1994–2014).
 Bob Dudley (1973), former CEO of BP.<ref name="New BP chief has Hinsdale connection">{{cite web|last=Bosch |first=Sandy |url=http://www.pioneerlocal.com/clarendonhills/news/2539958,clarendon-hills-dudley-072910-s1.article |title=Bosch, ; 'New BP chief has Hinsdale connection; 27 July 2010; Pioneer Local; accessed 27 July 2010 |publisher=Pioneerlocal.com |date=July 27, 2010 |access-date=July 8, 2010}}</ref>
 Bill Evans (1976), jazz saxophonist.
 Andrew Gutman (2015), professional soccer player for Celtic & FC Cincinnati in the MLS. Played college soccer for Indiana Hoosiers.
Rebecca Haarlow (1997), sports journalist and sideline reporter.
Thomas Ives (2014), NFL player for Chicago Bears
 John Kinsella (1970),  swimmer, gold medalist at the 1972 Olympics, silver medalist at the 1968 Olympics, International Swimming Hall of Fame.
 Ricardo Lamas, professional Mixed Martial Artist, in the UFC Featherweight Division.
 Parker Mack (2015), actor in Freeform drama Chasing Life, and in the MTV romantic comedy series, Faking It.''
 Graham McIlvaine (2010), volleyball player on the United States men's national volleyball team.
 Meredith Monroe (1988), actress.
 John Murphy (1971), swimmer, gold and bronze medalist at the 1972 Summer Olympics.
 Joseph Nechvatal (1969), visual artist.
 Robert Nieman (1966), 1979 Modern pentathlon World Champion and 3-time Olympic athlete.
 Cathy Richardson (1986), actress, singer, songwriter.
 Marty Riessen (1960), professional tennis player, five–time member of the United States Davis Cup team, Wimbledon, U.S. Open, Australian Open and French Open doubles champion
 Rishi Shah (born 1986), businessman, founder of Outcome Health. 
 Bill Veeck (attended Hinsdale Central, then transferred to Phillips Andover Academy), Major League Baseball team executive and owner, elected to the Baseball Hall of Fame in 1991.
 Brian Wardle (1997), head coach of the Bradley University men's basketball team since 2015, reached the 2019 NCAA tournament.

References

Further reading
Baaken, Timothy.  HINSDALE.  Hinsdale, Ill.:  Hinsdale Doings, 1976.
Dugan, Hugh.  VILLAGE ON THE COUNTY LINE.  Privately Printed, 1949.
Sterling, Tom, and Mary Sterling.  HINSDALE AND THE WORLD.  Hinsdale, Ill.:  Sterling Books, 19

External links
 School Website
 Devil's Advocate School Newspaper Website
 Athletics Website
 School Profile  & Reviews on GreatSchools.net

Public high schools in Illinois
Hinsdale, Illinois
Schools in DuPage County, Illinois
1879 establishments in Illinois
Educational institutions established in 1879